Laurence Gross (1931 - 2003) was a television and radio broadcaster in San Diego.  Initially a radio talk show host in Denver and San Diego, he was later the entertainment critic  at large on KNSD. In Denver, he helped launch the radio career of Alan Berg. In San Diego, Gross was mid-day radio talk show host on KSDO from 1975 to 1983. Gross' father was KFMB-TV founder Jack O. Gross.

References

1931 births
2003 deaths